The 2017 New York Yankees season was the 115th season for the New York Yankees. It was also the final season with manager Joe Girardi. The Yankees finished the regular season with 91 wins and 71 losses. This season was considered a breakout season for many players, including starting pitcher Luis Severino who emerged as arguably the Yankees' best pitcher as well as rookie outfielder  Aaron Judge, who broke the rookie record by passing Mark McGwire for most home runs by a rookie (50) on September 25. Judge ended the season by leading the American League with 52 home runs. The Yankees also clinched a playoff berth after missing the playoffs the previous year and won at least 90 games for the first time since 2012. They struggled to catch up to the defending American League East champions the Boston Red Sox after being in first place for the beginning of the season but managed to clinch their sixth wild card berth, their third in seven seasons. They defeated the Minnesota Twins 8–4 in the Wild Card Game (their first postseason game win in five years) and the Cleveland Indians in five games (after falling into an 0–2 deficit after the first two games in Cleveland) in the Division Series before losing to the Houston Astros in seven games in the 2017 American League Championship Series. Notably, during the postseason the Yankees were 6–0 at home, yet 1–6 on the road, and played an ALCS series that saw every single game won by the home team. Also, it would be also notable for being the silver jubilee season for the long time Yankee broadcaster Michael Kay and the 15th anniversary season of the team's current cable channel, YES Network.

Offseason

Free agent acquisitions
 December 7, 2016:  Signed left fielder Matt Holliday for one year and $13 million.
 December 15, 2016: Signed closer, Aroldis Chapman to a five-year, $86 million deal, the largest ever for a reliever.
 February 16, 2017: Signed 1B/OF Chris Carter on a one-year, $3 million deal.

Trades
 December 3, 2016: Traded Brian McCann to the Houston Astros for Jorge Guzman and Albert Abreu.
 December 20, 2016: Traded Nick Goody to the Cleveland Indians for a player to be named later or cash considerations. The transaction was completed on May 5 with the Yankees acquiring RHP Yoiber Marquina.

Spring training

The Yankees had one of their most successful spring training performances in recent memory, finishing with a 24-9-1 record - the best in the major leagues.

The team had many players participate in the 2017 World Baseball Classic, including shortstop Didi Gregorius (Netherlands) and relievers Dellin Betances (Dominican Republic), Tyler Clippard (United States), and Tommy Layne (Italy).

One of the most notable elements of Yankees camp in 2017 was the presence of top prospects. Infielders Gleyber Torres, Miguel Andujar, Tyler Wade, and Jorge Mateo, outfielders Clint Frazier, Dustin Fowler, and Aaron Judge, and pitchers Chad Green, James Kaprielian, and Jordan Montgomery highlighted the Yankees' strong farm system's presence at spring training.

Another prominent story in the early going was the rotation battle, with six pitchers battling for the final two spots following Masahiro Tanaka, Michael Pineda, and CC Sabathia: Luis Cessa, Green, Bryan Mitchell, Montgomery, Luis Severino, and Adam Warren. Each pitcher performed well in the first few weeks of Spring Training, making manager Joe Girardi's decision a difficult one. In the end, Severino came away with the fourth starter role, with the team waiting until April 10 to announce that Montgomery had won the fifth starter job. He'd make his MLB debut on April 12 against Tampa Bay.

Other position battles in Tampa included that for the starting right field job, between former first-round pick Judge and fourth outfielder Aaron Hicks. Another key competition was an unforeseen battle for the Opening Day shortstop job, as Didi Gregorius was lost for the first month with a shoulder injury suffered in the WBC. Prospect Wade, non-roster invitees Pete Kozma and Ruben Tejada, and utility infielder Ronald Torreyes all competed for the job. Not included in the shuffle were top prospects Torres and Mateo, much to the chagrin of Yankees fans. The jobs were eventually awarded to Judge and Torreyes.

On March 17, three Yankees pitchers combined to no-hit the Detroit Tigers. Tanaka allowed two walks and an error over 4 1/3 innings, Chasen Shreve retired the two batters he faced, and Montgomery shut down Detroit's final 12 batters as the Yankees won, 3–0. It was the first no-hitter in Spring Training since the Atlanta Braves tied the Houston Astros in 2015, and the first for the Yankees since an 11–0 drubbing of the Pittsburgh Pirates in 1983.

Regular season

April

Going into the start of the regular season, the Yankees were a mystery to many analysts, as the team was not expected to do much while putting up historic numbers in spring training. Masahiro Tanaka, who had put up spectacular statistics during the spring, including having pitched in a combined no-hitter, was tagged to start Opening Day against the Tampa Bay Rays, in which he'd struggle greatly. CC Sabathia pitched the second game of the young season, pulling the team to a 1–1 record, but the rest of the rotation continued to struggle. Through the team's first five games (3 at Tampa Bay, 2 at Baltimore Orioles) the Yankees were 1–4. In the third game of the series against the Orioles, the Yankees came from behind to win the game, going into their first home stand of the season having gotten their second win.

This momentum would benefit the team greatly, as the Yankees would sweep the first 2 series at Yankee Stadium (3 games against the Rays, 3 games against the St. Louis Cardinals), and taking 2 of 3 against the Chicago White Sox. The Yankees would continue to maintain this momentum through the rest of April, finishing the month with a record of 15–8.

One of the main storylines of the early season were the series of injuries the Yankees suffered. The team started the season without their shortstop, Didi Gregorius, who had maintained an injury playing in the 2017 World Baseball Classic. The team also lost rookie sensation catcher Gary Sanchez within the first five games, and Greg Bird, the first baseman who had missed the entire 2016 season, was performing abysmally, recording only six hits in his first 60 at bats. However, the team managed to work around these issues. Ronald Torreyes and Austin Romine, who were brought in to replace Gregorius and Sanchez, respectively, blew away the expectations placed on them and put up some of the best numbers for players at their positions. Aaron Hicks, who had struggled for much of the 2016 season played exceedingly well, Chase Headley put his lackluster performance in April of the previous season to shame, Starlin Castro hit well enough for the second-best batting average in the American League, and the rotation as a whole pitched amazingly, putting up some of the best numbers in the American League.

By far the biggest story of April, though, was rookie outfielder Aaron Judge. Having struggled in his debut season of 2016, Judge worked extensively over the offseason to adjust his mechanics, reducing his strikeouts and increasing contact rate, while honing his impressive natural power. The adjustments were wildly successful, as Judge dramatically reduced his strikeout rate, put up one of the best batting averages in the league, and tied the record for most home runs by a rookie in the month of April, with 10. He would continue his slugging ways, hit 10 home runs in April, tying a Major League record for rookies.

In a very dramatic game, on Friday, April 28, 2017, the Yankees, at home facing the Orioles, struggled offensively to start the game, with starter Sabathia proving to be ineffective. At the middle of the 6th inning, the Orioles held a 9–1 lead over the Yankees. The Yankees would then put up 3 runs in the bottom of the 6th, to which the Orioles responded by adding 2 more runs, making the game 11–4. The Yankees would attempt to shorten the gap with a Jacoby Ellsbury grand slam to make it 11–8. The Yankees would then score a run in the 9th with an RBI groundout by Ellsbury, followed by a two-run shot by Castro to tie the game. Then, with one out in the bottom of the 10th, Matt Holliday won the game with a 3-run walk-off homerun, capping off an "impossible" comeback win. With it, the Yankees won their fourth come-from-behind game in which they were losing by 8-or-more runs since 2005, twice as many as the next best team.

May

The Yankees entered May tied with the Baltimore Orioles for first place in the AL East with a 15–8 (.652) record, much better than their 8–15 (.348) 23-game start in 2016. During the opening series of May, Jacoby Ellsbury sustained an injury that would sideline him for nearly a week after colliding into the Yankee Stadium center field wall in a game against the Toronto Blue Jays. On May 2, first baseman Greg Bird was placed on the 10-day disabled list with a nagging ankle injury. The next day, right fielder Aaron Judge was named Rookie of the Month for April, 2017, beating out solid performances from Boston's Andrew Benintendi and Seattle's Mitch Haniger.

On May 7, the Yankees completed a sweep of the defending-champion Chicago Cubs at Wrigley Field in Chicago with an 18-inning 5–4 victory that extended deep into the night (it lasted over six hours by the time the night was done). After closer Aroldis Chapman blew his first save of the season by allowing three runs in the bottom of the ninth, the Yankees' bullpen carried the team through another complete game's worth of extra innings. Of note in this game was the fact that the Yankees and Cubs set the MLB record for strikeouts in a single game with 48. The Yankees also set a major-league record of seven pitchers with multiple strikeouts in their appearances (Luis Severino, Dellin Betances, Chapman, Tyler Clippard, Adam Warren, Jonathan Holder, and Chasen Shreve). Following the victory (and the Washington Nationals' loss), the Yankees held sole possession of the best record in the major leagues at 20–9.

The Yankees retired Derek Jeter's No.2 jersey and played a single-admission double-header on Mother's Day, May 12. The rest of the month would see the Yankees cool off, a result of struggles from Tanaka, a lower output by the offense in general, and a slow-down in the rate Judge hit homers, though he would still finish out the month with 17 homeruns on the season and the AL Rookie of the Month for May. The Yankees would compete with the Orioles for first place until the last week of the month, with the Orioles falling to third, being leapfrogged by the Red Sox. On May 31, the Yankees sat in first place with a record of 30–20 (good for the second-best AL record, behind the 1st place Houston Astros), the Red Sox sitting at 29–23 and the Orioles at 27–24.

June
From June 7–11, the Yankees scored 8 or more runs in 5 straight games for the first time since 1956.

July
On July 18 the Yankees acquired Todd Frazier, David Robertson and Tommy Kahnle in a 7-player trade with the Chicago White Sox.

August

Yankees-Tigers brawl
On August 24, 2017, at Comerica Park the Yankees and Detroit Tigers game broke into a brawl. The altercation led to several suspensions and fines for players on both teams, with the game being labeled as the "MLB's wildest game of the 2017 season."

With the Tigers up 6–3, Yankees pitcher Aroldis Chapman began to warm up in replacement for the ejected Kahnle. Yankees catcher Austin Romine and Tigers designated hitter Miguel Cabrera were standing facing each other behind the plate, as Romine was due to catch and Cabrera was due to bat. With Torres' back turned facing them, the two exchanged phrases until Cabrera stepped towards Romine, leading Romine to take off his catcher's mask. Cabrera then shoved Romine in the chest. Romine tackled Cabrera to the ground, with the two throwing punches at each other. At this point, the benches on both sides cleared, and a fight formed in the center of the field. Gary Sánchez ran out from the dugout and landed punches on Cabrera and Tigers' third baseman Nicholas Castellanos before his teammate, injured Yankees' outfielder Clint Frazier, attempted to restrain Sánchez. Austin Romine ended up beside his brother, Tigers infielder Andrew Romine. As the fight cleared, both Austin Romine and Cabrera were ejected from the game for their roles in the fight.

In a postgame press conference, Girardi visibly expressed frustration with the umpiring crew for their mishandling of the situation, specifically the lack of a warning after Fulmer's hit on Sánchez. "If you can't see that Fulmer clearly hit Sánchez on purpose, there's something wrong. I think it could have really been avoidable." He stressed the importance of the game due to the Yankees' playoff aspirations compared to the 4th-place Tigers, and cited an inconsistent strike zone at the end of the game. Regarding Romine's ejection, he said "Cabrera went after him and you're gonna throw my catcher out for protecting himself? I mean, pay attention. Somebody's gotta pay attention to what's going on in this game." He demanded additional discipline for Ausmus, rhetorically asking, "Brad Ausmus is going to say 'F-you' to one of my players? Come on, Brad. What is that?"

Romine claimed that Cabrera asked him, "You got a fucking problem with me?", then took off his mask and got shoved to the ground. "It felt like he wanted a confrontation there and I just tried to defend myself the best I could." Sánchez, who was seen throwing punches, stated through his interpreter that "At that moment, instinct just takes over, because you want to defend your teammate. That's your family out there."

Gardner, who was involved in altercations with Ausmus and Iglesias, said "I thought the way things were handled, things got out of hand in a hurry. You'd like to see that get squashed from the start. It's not good for the game... I think any time you go through some controversy, it can bring guys together." Todd Frazier, on getting hit by Wilson, said "I thought everything was done with. I just kept asking him, 'Did you do that on purpose?' He wouldn't say a word, just kept staring at me, and that's when I got pretty excited."

The next day, Major League Baseball announced discipline for the players involved in the brawl, including the suspensions of five players and managers and the finings of seven additional participants. Cabrera received the longest suspension at seven games, while Yankees catcher Sánchez received the longest suspension on his team at four games. All disciplined players had their suspensions reduced by one game following appeals.

The Yankees were swept at home by the American League-leading Cleveland team from August 28–30, after which Cleveland went on to record a historic 22-game win streak.

September
In September, Aaron Judge broke out of a prolonged slump and the Yankees pulled ahead in the American League wildcard race by winning 23 of their final 34 games.  From September 11–13 a three-game series against the Tampa Bay Rays was relocated from Tropicana Field to Citi Field due to Hurricane Irma, marking the first time since 1998 that the Yankees played a game in Queens not against the Mets.

The Yankees clinched a post-season berth in Toronto on September 23. The Yankees continued their 6-man starting rotation throughout the month. Both relief pitchers Dellin Betances and Aroldis Chapman showed some struggles during this month.

On September 25 in a makeup game against the Kansas City Royals, Aaron Judge tied and broke the MLB rookie record for home runs hit in a single year. In doing so, he also became the youngest player to have 7 multi-home run games in Yankee history since Babe Ruth and Mickey Mantle.

October
The Yankees won the AL Wild Card Game 8–4.
The Yankees rallied from trailing 0–2 to rally to win the ALDS in 5 games against the Cleveland Indians.
Yankees also trailed the ALCS 0–2. Then they won 3 straight home games and were 1 win away from heading to the World Series but failed and lost in Game 7 against the Astros ending what would’ve been a Cinderella run. On October 26, 5 days after the Yankees were eliminated the team announced that they would not bring back Joe Girardi for the 2018 season.

Season standings

American League East

American League Wild Card

Record against opponents

Roster

Game log

 

|- bgcolor="ffbbbb"
| 1 || April 2 || @ Rays || 3–7 || Archer (1–0) || Tanaka (0–1) || Colomé (1) || Tropicana Field || 31,042 || 0–1
|- bgcolor="bbffbb"
| 2 || April 4 || @ Rays || 5–0 || Sabathia (1–0) || Odorizzi (0–1) || – || Tropicana Field || 19,366 || 1–1
|- bgcolor="ffbbbb"
| 3 || April 5 || @ Rays || 1–4 || Cobb (1–0) || Pineda (0–1) || Colomé (2) || Tropicana Field || 12,737 || 1–2
|- bgcolor="ffbbbb"
| 4 || April 7 || @ Orioles || 5–6 || Hart (1–0) || Clippard (0–1) || Britton (2)  || Oriole Park ||  25,248 || 1–3
|- bgcolor="ffbbbb"
| 5 || April 8 || @ Orioles || 4–5 || Givens (1–0) || Betances (0–1) || Britton (3) || Oriole Park || 38,916 || 1–4
|- bgcolor="bbffbb"
| 6 || April 9 || @ Orioles || 7–3 || Betances (1–1) || O'Day (0–1) || – || Oriole Park || 42,487 || 2–4
|- bgcolor="bbffbb"
| 7 || April 10 || Rays || 8–1 || Pineda (1–1)  || Cobb (1–1) || – || Yankee Stadium || 46,955  || 3–4
|- bgcolor="bbffbb"
| 8 || April 12 || Rays || 8–4 || Mitchell (1–0) || Diaz (0–1)  || Chapman (1) || Yankee Stadium || 38,002  || 4–4
|- bgcolor="bbffbb"
| 9 || April 13 || Rays || 3–2 || Severino (1–0) || Cedeno (1–1)  || Chapman (2)  || Yankee Stadium || 34,772 ||5–4
|- bgcolor="bbffbb"
| 10 || April 14 || Cardinals || 4–3 || Tanaka (1–1) || Wacha (1–1)  || Chapman (3)  || Yankee Stadium || 39,102 || 6–4
|- bgcolor="bbffbb"
| 11 || April 15 || Cardinals || 3–2 || Sabathia (2–0)  || Martinez (0–2) || Clippard (1) || Yankee Stadium || 43,031 || 7–4
|- bgcolor="bbffbb"
| 12 || April 16 || Cardinals || 9–3 || Pineda (2–1) || Wainwright (0–3) || – || Yankee Stadium || 31,706 || 8–4
|- bgcolor="bbffbb"
| 13 || April 17 || White Sox || 7–4 || Montgomery (1–0) || Holland (1–2) || Chapman (4) || Yankee Stadium || 28,181 || 9–4
|- bgcolor="ffbbbb"
| 14 || April 18 || White Sox || 1–4 || González (2–0) || Severino (1–1) || Robertson (4) || Yankee Stadium || 30,075 || 9–5
|- bgcolor="bbffbb"
| 15 || April 19 || White Sox || 9–1 || Tanaka (2–1) || Covey (0–1) ||  – || Yankee Stadium || 30,014 || 10–5
|- bgcolor="ffbbbb"
| 16 || April 21 || @ Pirates || 3–6 || Nicasio (1–2) || Sabathia (2–1)  || Watson (5) || PNC Park || 30,565 || 10–6
|- bgcolor="bbffbb"
| 17 || April 22 || @ Pirates ||11–5 || Betances (2–1) || Rivero (1–1) || – || PNC Park || 36,140 || 11–6
|- bgcolor="ffbbbb"
| 18 || April 23 || @ Pirates || 1–2 || Nova (2–2) || Montgomery (1–1) || Watson (6) || PNC Park || 36,140 || 11–7
|- bgcolor="bbbbbb"
| –– || April 25 || @ Red Sox || colspan=7 |Postponed (rain). Makeup date: July 16. as a doubleheader
|- bgcolor="bbffbb"
| 19 || April 26 || @ Red Sox || 3–1 || Severino (2–1) || Porcello (1–3) || Chapman (5) || Fenway Park || 32,072 || 12–7
|- bgcolor="bbffbb"
| 20 || April 27 || @ Red Sox ||3–0|| Tanaka (3–1)|| Sale (1–2)  || – || Fenway Park || 34,054 ||13–7
|- bgcolor="bbffbb"
| 21 || April 28 || Orioles || 14–11  || Chapman (1–0) || Aquino (1–1) || – || Yankee Stadium || 36,912 || 14–7
|- bgcolor="bbffbb"
| 22 || April 29 || Orioles || 12–4 || Pineda (3–1) || Jiménez (1–1)  || – || Yankee Stadium || 37,303 || 15–7
|- bgcolor="ffbbbb"
| 23 || April 30 || Orioles || 4–7  || Verrett (1–0) || Mitchell (1–1)  || – || Yankee Stadium ||41,022  || 15–8

|- bgcolor="ffbbbb"
| 24 || May 1 || Blue Jays || 1–7 || Estrada (1–1) || Severino (2–2) || – || Yankee Stadium || 25,566 || 15–9
|- bgcolor="bbffbb"
| 25 || May 2 || Blue Jays || 11–5 || Tanaka (4–1) || Latos (0–1) || — || Yankee Stadium || 30,058 || 16–9
|- bgcolor="bbffbb"
| 26 || May 3 || Blue Jays || 8–6 || Betances (3–1) || Biagini (0–1) || Chapman (6) || Yankee Stadium || 35,559 || 17–9
|- bgcolor="bbffbb"
| 27 || May 5 || @ Cubs || 3–2 || Holder (1–0) || Rondón (0–1) || Chapman (7) || Wrigley Field || 40,395 || 18–9
|- bgcolor="bbffbb"
| 28 || May 6 || @ Cubs || 11–6 || Montgomery (2–1) || Anderson (2–2) || — || Wrigley Field || 40,735 || 19–9
|- bgcolor="bbffbb"
| 29 || May 7 || @ Cubs || 5–4  || Shreve (1–0) || Strop (0–2) || — || Wrigley Field || 40,584 || 20–9
|- bgcolor="bbffbb"
| 30 || May 8 || @ Reds || 10–4 || Tanaka (5–1) || Davis (1–2) || — || Great American Ball Park || 25,960 || 21–9
|- bgcolor="ffbbbb"
| 31 || May 9 || @ Reds || 3–5 || Adleman (2–1) || Sabathia (2–2) || Iglesias (6) || Great American Ball Park || 22,035 || 21–10
|- bgcolor="ffbbbb"
| 32 || May 11 || Astros || 2–3 || Keuchel (6–0) || Pineda (3–2) || Giles (10) || Yankee Stadium || 39,050 || 21–11
|- bgcolor="ffbbbb"
| 33 || May 12 || Astros || 1–5 || McCullers Jr. (3–1) || Montgomery (2–2) || — || Yankee Stadium || 41,150 || 21–12
|- bgcolor="bbbbbb"
| –– || May 13 || Astros || colspan=7 |Postponed (inclement weather). Makeup date: May 14 as a doubleheader
|- bgcolor="bbffbb"
| 34 || May 14 || Astros || 11–6 || Warren (1–0) || Harris (1–1) || – || Yankee Stadium || N/A || 22–12
|- bgcolor="ffbbbb"
| 35 || May 14 || Astros || 7–10 || Morton (5–2) || Tanaka (5–2) || – || Yankee Stadium || 47,883 || 22–13
|- bgcolor="bbffbb"
| 36 || May 16 || @ Royals || 7–1 || Sabathia (3–2) || Hammel (1–5) || – || Kauffman Stadium || 30,878 || 23–13
|- bgcolor="bbffbb"
| 37 || May 17 || @ Royals || 11–7 || Pineda (4–2) || Vargas (5–2) || Betances (1) || Kauffman Stadium || 22,899 || 24–13
|- bgcolor="ffbbbb"
| 38 || May 18 || @ Royals || 1–5 || Duffy (3–3) || Montgomery (2–3) || – || Kauffman Stadium || 22,803 || 24–14
|- bgcolor="ffbbbb"
| 39 || May 19 || @ Rays || 4–5 || Farquhar (2–1) || Clippard (0–2) || Colomé (11) || Tropicana Field || 21,146 || 24–15
|- bgcolor="ffbbbb"
| 40 || May 20 || @ Rays || 5–9 || Andriese (4–1) || Tanaka (5–3) || – || Tropicana Field || 22,864 || 24–16
|- bgcolor="bbffbb"
| 41 || May 21 || @ Rays || 3–2 || Sabathia (4–2) || Archer (3–3) || Betances (2) || Tropicana Field || 20,873 || 25–16
|- bgcolor="bbffbb"
| 42 || May 22 || Royals || 4–2 || Pineda (5–2) || Vargas (5–3) || Betances (3) || Yankee Stadium || 35,005 || 26–16
|- bgcolor="ffbbbb"
| 43 || May 23 || Royals || 2–6 || Duffy (4–3) || Warren (1–1) ||  || Yankee Stadium || 35,931 || 26–17
|- bgcolor="bbffbb"
| 44 || May 24 || Royals || 3–0 || Severino (3–2) || Hammel (1–6) || Betances (4) || Yankee Stadium || 34,610 || 27–17
|- bgcolor="bbbbbb"
| — || May 25 || Royals || colspan=7 |Postponed (rain). Makeup date: September 25
|- bgcolor="ffbbbb"
| 45 || May 26 || Athletics || 1–4 || Manaea (3–3) || Tanaka (5–4) ||  || Yankee Stadium || 39,044 || 27–18
|- bgcolor="bbffbb"
| 46 || May 27 || Athletics || 3–2 || Sabathia (5–2) || Cotton (3–5)  || Betances (5) || Yankee Stadium || 40,218 || 28–18
|- bgcolor="bbffbb"
| 47 || May 28 || Athletics || 9–5 || Pineda (6–2) || Triggs (5–4) || Warren (1) || Yankee Stadium || 45,232 || 29–18
|- bgcolor="ffbbbb"
| 48 || May 29 || @ Orioles || 2–3 || Bundy (6–3) || Montgomery (2–4) || Brach (10) || Oriole Park || 40,242 || 29–19
|- bgcolor="bbffbb"
| 49 || May 30 || @ Orioles || 8–3 || Severino (4–2) || Tillman (1–2) || – || Oriole Park || 16,126 || 30–19
|- bgcolor="ffbbbb"
| 50 || May 31 || @ Orioles || 4–10 || Gausman (3–4) || Tanaka (5–5) || – || Oriole Park || 22,983 || 30–20 

|- bgcolor="bbffbb"
| 51 || June 1 || @ Blue Jays || 12–2 || Sabathia (6–2) || Estrada (4–3) || — || Rogers Centre || 37,722 || 31–20
|- bgcolor="ffbbbb"
| 52 || June 2 || @ Blue Jays || 5–7 || Liriano (3–2) || Pineda (6–3) || Osuna (12) || Rogers Centre || 44,261 || 31–21
|- bgcolor="bbffbb"
| 53 || June 3 || @ Blue Jays || 7–0 || Montgomery (3–4) || Biagini (1–4) || — || Rogers Centre || 47,226 || 32–21
|- bgcolor="ffbbbb"
| 54 || June 4 || @ Blue Jays || 2–3 || Smith (2–0) || Clippard (0–3) || Osuna (13) || Rogers Centre || 46,782 || 32–22
|- bgcolor="ffbbbb"
| 55 || June 6 || Red Sox || 4–5 || Pomeranz (6–3) || Tanaka (5–6) || Kimbrel (17) || Yankee Stadium || 41,516 || 32–23
|- bgcolor="bbffbb"
| 56 || June 7 || Red Sox || 8–0 || Sabathia (7–2) || Porcello (3–8) || — || Yankee Stadium || 44,380 || 33–23
|- bgcolor="bbffbb"
| 57 || June 8 || Red Sox || 9–1 || Pineda (7–3) || Price (1–1) || — || Yankee Stadium || 46,194 || 34–23
|- bgcolor="bbffbb"
| 58 || June 9 || Orioles || 8–2 || Montgomery (4–4) || Bundy (6–5) || — || Yankee Stadium || 46,031 || 35–23
|- bgcolor="bbffbb"
| 59 || June 10 || Orioles || 16–3 || Severino (5-2)  || Tillman (1-4) ||  || Yankee Stadium || 45,232 || 36–23
|- bgcolor="bbffbb"
| 60 || June 11 || Orioles || 14–3 || Warren (2–1)  || Gausman (3–5) ||  || Yankee Stadium || 46,348 || 37–23
|- bgcolor="bbffbb"
| 61 || June 12 || @ Angels || 5–3 || Clippard (1–3) || Álvarez (0–3) || Betances (6) || Angel Stadium || 36,245 || 38–23
|- bgcolor="ffbbbb"
| 62 || June 13 || @ Angels || 2–3  || Middleton (2–0) || Shreve (1–1) || — || Angel Stadium || 33,159 || 38–24
|- bgcolor="ffbbbb"
| 63 || June 14 || @ Angels || 5–7 || Parker (2–2) || Herrera (0–1) || Hernandez (1) || Angel Stadium || 43,851 || 38–25
|- bgcolor="ffbbbb"
| 64 || June 15 || @ Athletics || 7–8  || Hendriks (3–1) || Gallegos (0–1) || — || Oakland Coliseum || 21,838 || 38–26
|- bgcolor="ffbbbb"
| 65 || June 16 || @ Athletics || 6–7 || Coulombe (1–1) || Holder (1–1) || Casilla (11) || Oakland Coliseum || 30,184 || 38–27
|- bgcolor="ffbbbb"
| 66 || June 17 || @ Athletics || 2–5 || Jesse Hahn (3–4) || Tanaka (5–7) || Doolittle (2) || Oakland Coliseum || 31,418 || 38–28
|- bgcolor="ffbbbb"
| 67 || June 18 || @ Athletics || 3–4 || Cotton (4–7) || Cessa (0–1) || Doolittle (3) || Oakland Coliseum || 34,140 || 38–29
|- bgcolor="ffbbbb"
| 68 || June 20 || Angels || 3–8 || Parker (3–2) || Clippard (1–4) || — || Yankee Stadium || 39,853 || 38–30
|- bgcolor="bbffbb"
| 69 || June 21 || Angels || 8–4 || Montgomery (5–4) || Nolasco (2–9) || – || Yankee Stadium || 39,911 || 39–30
|- bgcolor="ffbbbb"
| 70 || June 22 || Angels || 5–10 || Petit (2–0) || Severino (5–3) || – || Yankee Stadium ||  43,051 || 39–31
|- bgcolor="bbffbb"
| 71 || June 23 || Rangers || 2–1  || Shreve (2–1) || Bush (2–3) || – || Yankee Stadium || 39,602 || 40–31
|- bgcolor="ffbbbb"
| 72 || June 24 || Rangers || 1–8 || Bibens-Dirkx (3–0) || Cessa (0–2) || — || Yankee Stadium || 40,225 || 40–32
|- bgcolor="ffbbbb"
| 73 || June 25 || Rangers || 6–7 || Martinez (3–3) || Pineda (7–4) || Bush (9) || Yankee Stadium || 46,625 || 40–33
|- bgcolor="bbffbb"
| 74 || June 26 || @ White Sox || 6–5 || Montgomery (6–4) || Holmberg (1–2) || Chapman (8) || U.S. Cellular Field || 20,339 || 41–33
|- bgcolor="ffbbbb"
| 75 || June 27 || @ White Sox || 3–4 || Jennings (3–1) || Betances (3–2) || — || U.S. Cellular Field || 18,023 || 41–34
|- bgcolor="bbffbb"
| 76 || June 28 || @ White Sox || 12–3 || Tanaka (6–7) || Rodon (0–1) || — || U.S. Cellular Field || 15,259 || 42–34
|- bgcolor="ffbbbb"
| 77 || June 29 || @ White Sox || 3–4 || Shields (2–1) || Cessa (0–3) || Robertson (12) || U.S. Cellular Field || 21,032 || 42–35
|- bgcolor="bbffbb"
| 78 || June 30 || @ Astros || 13–4 || Pineda (8–4) || Feliz (4–2) || Mitchell (1) || Minute Maid Park || 40,024 || 43–35 

|- bgcolor="ffbbbb"
| 79 || July 1 || @ Astros || 6–7 || Diaz (1–1) || Betances (3–3) || Giles (19) || Minute Maid Park || 41,010 || 43–36
|- bgcolor="ffbbbb"
| 80 || July 2 || @ Astros || 1–8 || Devenski (5–3) || Severino (5–4) || — || Minute Maid Park || 41,761 || 43–37
|- bgcolor="bbffbb"
| 81 || July 3 || Blue Jays || 6–3 || Tanaka (7–7) || Stroman (8–5) || – || Yankee Stadium || 46,616 || 44–37
|- bgcolor="ffbbbb"
| 82 || July 4 || Blue Jays || 1–4 || Happ (6–5) || Sabathia (7–3) || Osuna (20) || Yankee Stadium || 44,018 || 44–38
|- bgcolor="ffbbbb"
| 83 || July 5 || Blue Jays || 6–7 || Barnes (2–2) || Betances (3–4) || Osuna (21) || Yankee Stadium || 38,691 || 44–39
|- bgcolor="ffbbbb"
| 84 || July 7 || Brewers || 4–9 || Hader (1–0) || Clippard (1–5) || — || Yankee Stadium || 43,472 || 44–40
|- bgcolor="bbffbb"
| 85 || July 8 || Brewers || 5–3 || Chapman (2–0) || Knebel (0–2) || – || Yankee Stadium || 40,224 || 45–40
|- bgcolor="ffbbbb"
| 86 || July 9 || Brewers || 3–5 || Nelson (8–4) || Tanaka (7–8) || Knebel (14) || Yankee Stadium || 43,952 || 45–41
|- style="text-align:center; background:#bbcaff;"
| colspan=10 | 88th All-Star Game in Miami, Florida
|- bgcolor="ffbbbb"
| 87 || July 14 || @ Red Sox || 4–5 || Scott (1–1) || Chapman (2–1) || — || Fenway Park || 37,570 || 45–42
|- bgcolor="bbffbb"
| 88 || July 15 || @ Red Sox || 4–1  || Heller (1–0) || Fister (0–3) || – || Fenway Park || 36,936 || 46–42
|- bgcolor="bbffbb"
| 89 || July 16 || @ Red Sox || 3–0 || Sabathia (8–3) || Porcello (4–12) || Chapman (9) || Fenway Park || 37,343 || 47–42
|- bgcolor="ffbbbb"
| 90 || July 16 || @ Red Sox || 0–3 || Price (5–2) || Tanaka (7–9) || Kimbrel (24) || Fenway Park || 36,719 || 47–43
|- bgcolor="ffbbbb"
| 91 || July 17 || @ Twins || 2–4 || Rogers (5–1) || Smith (0–1) || Kintzler (26) || Target Field || 27,566 || 47–44
|- bgcolor="bbffbb"
| 92 || July 18 || @ Twins || 6–3 || Shreve (3–1) || Colón (2–9) || Chapman (10) || Target Field || 33,114 || 48–44
|- bgcolor="ffbbbb"
| 93 || July 19 || @ Twins || 1–6 || Berríos (9–3) || Montgomery (6–5) || — || Target Field || 33,380 || 48–45
|- bgcolor="bbffbb"
| 94 || July 20 || @ Mariners || 4–1 || Severino (6–4) || Hernández (5–4) || — || Safeco Field || 35,175 || 49–45
|- bgcolor="bbffbb"
| 95 || July 21 || @ Mariners || 5–1 || Sabathia (9–3) || Moore (1–2) || — || Safeco Field || 34,073 || 50–45
|- bgcolor="ffbbbb"
| 96 || July 22 || @ Mariners || 5–6  || Zych (4–2) || Warren (2–2) || — || Safeco Field || 46,197 || 50–46
|- bgcolor="bbffbb"
| 97 || July 23 || @ Mariners || 6–4 || Green (1–0) || Pazos (2–3)  || Chapman (11) || Safeco Field || 38,503 || 51–46
|- bgcolor="bbffbb"
| 98 || July 25 || Reds || 4–2 || Montgomery (7–5) || Castillo (1–4) || Chapman (12) || Yankee Stadium || 44,258 || 52–46
|- bgcolor="bbffbb"
| 99 || July 26 || Reds || 9–5 || Severino (7–4) || Bailey (2–5) || — || Yankee Stadium || 42,421 || 53–46
|- bgcolor="bbffbb"
| 100 || July 27 || Rays || 6–5  || Chapman (3–1) || Kittredge (0–1) || — || Yankee Stadium || 44,033 || 54–46
|- bgcolor="bbffbb"
| 101 || July 28 || Rays || 6–1 || Tanaka (8–9) || Pruitt (5–2) || — || Yankee Stadium || 40,470 || 55–46
|- bgcolor="bbffbb"
| 102 || July 29 || Rays || 5–4 || Chapman (4–1) || Boxberger (2–3) || — || Yankee Stadium || 43,015 || 56–46
|- bgcolor="ffbbbb"
| 103 || July 30 || Rays || 3–5 || Cishek (2–1) || Montgomery (7–6) || Colomé (30) || Yankee Stadium || 41,547 || 56–47
|- bgcolor="bbffbb"
| 104 || July 31 || Tigers || 7–3 || Severino (8–4) || Fulmer (10–9) || Chapman (13) || Yankee Stadium || 39,904 || 57–47

|- bgcolor="ffbbbb"
| 105 || August 1 || Tigers || 3–4 || Sánchez (3–1) || Sabathia (9–4) || Greene (1) || Yankee Stadium || 43,238 || 57–48
|- bgcolor="ffbbbb"
| 106 || August 2 || Tigers || 0–2 || Zimmermann (7–8) || Tanaka (8–10) || Greene (2) || Yankee Stadium || 43,379 || 57–49
|- bgcolor="ffbbbb"
| 107 || August 3 || @ Indians || 1–5 || Kluber (9–3) || Gray (6–6) || — || Progressive Field || 28,124 || 57–50
|- bgcolor="ffbbbb"
| 108 || August 4 || @ Indians || 2–7 || Bauer (10–8) || García (5–8) || — || Progressive Field || 34,466 || 57–51
|- bgcolor="bbffbb"
| 109 || August 5 || @ Indians || 2–1 || Robertson (5–2) || McAllister (1–1) || Chapman (14) || Progressive Field || 34,651 || 58–51
|- bgcolor="bbffbb"
| 110 || August 6 || @ Indians || 8–1 || Severino (9–4) || Carrasco (10–5)|| —  || Progressive Field || 33,044 || 59–51
|- bgcolor="ffbbbb"
| 111 || August 8 || @ Blue Jays || 2–4 || Happ (5–8) || Sabathia (9–5) || Osuna (29) || Rogers Centre || 41,596 || 59–52
|- bgcolor="bbffbb"
| 112 || August 9 || @ Blue Jays || 11–5 || Green (2–0) || Tepesch (0–2) || — || Rogers Centre || 39,554 || 60–52
|- bgcolor="ffbbbb"
| 113 || August 10 || @ Blue Jays || 0–4 || Estrada (5–7) || Gray (6–7) || — || Rogers Centre || 43,212 || 60–53
|- bgcolor="bbffbb"
| 114 || August 11 || Red Sox || 5–4 || Warren (3–2) || Reed (1–3) || Chapman (15) || Yankee Stadium || 46,509 || 61–53
|- bgcolor="ffbbbb"
| 115 || August 12 || Red Sox || 5–10 || Pomeranz (12–4) || Severino (9–5) || — || Yankee Stadium || 47,241 || 61–54
|- bgcolor="ffbbbb"
| 116 || August 13 || Red Sox || 2–3  || Kimbrel (4–0) || Chapman (4–2) || — || Yankee Stadium || 46,610 || 61–55
|- bgcolor="bbffbb"
| 117 || August 14 || Mets || 4–2 || Robertson (6–2) || Robles (7–4) || Betances (7) || Yankee Stadium || 45,619 || 62–55
|- bgcolor="bbffbb"
| 118 || August 15 || Mets || 5–4 || Gray (7–7) || deGrom (13–6) || Chapman (16) || Yankee Stadium || 46,474 || 63–55
|- bgcolor="bbffbb"
| 119 || August 16 || @ Mets || 5–3 || Kahnle (2–3) || Sewald (0–5) || Robertson (14) || Citi Field || 42,260 || 64–55
|- bgcolor="bbffbb"
| 120 || August 17 || @ Mets || 7–5 || Severino (10–5) || Matz (2–7) || Betances (8) || Citi Field || 42,549 || 65–55
|- bgcolor="ffbbbb"
| 121 || August 18 || @ Red Sox || 6–9 || Reed (2–3) || Kahnle (2–4) || Kimbrel (29) || Fenway Park || 36,784 || 65–56
|- bgcolor="bbffbb"
| 122 || August 19 || @ Red Sox || 4–3 || Sabathia (10–5) || Sale (14–5) || Betances (9) || Fenway Park || 36,784 || 66–56
|- bgcolor="ffbbbb"
| 123 || August 20 || @ Red Sox || 1–5 || Porcello (8–14) || Gray (8–9) || — || Fenway Park || 36,911 || 66–57
|- bgcolor="bbffbb"
| 124 || August 22 || @ Tigers || 13–4 || Tanaka (9–10) || Boyd (5–7) || — || Comerica Park || 27,818 || 67–57
|- bgcolor="bbffbb"
| 125 || August 23 || @ Tigers || 10–2 || Severino (11–5) || Zimmermann (7–11) || — || Comerica Park || 29,695 || 68–57
|- bgcolor="ffbbbb"
| 126 || August 24 || @ Tigers || 6–10 || Wilson (2–4) || Betances (3–5) || Greene (4) || Comerica Park || 32,662 || 68–58
|- bgcolor="ffbbbb"
| 127 || August 25 || Mariners || 1–2  || Pazos (4–4) || Chapman (4–3) || Díaz (30)  || Yankee Stadium || 42,057 || 68–59
|- bgcolor="bbffbb"
| 128 || August 26 || Mariners || 6–3 || Gray (8–8) || Gallardo (5–10) || Betances (10) || Yankee Stadium || 39,810 || 69–59
|- bgcolor="bbffbb"
| 129 || August 27 || Mariners || 10–1 || Tanaka (10–10) || Albers (2–1) || — || Yankee Stadium || 40,112 || 70–59
|- bgcolor="ffbbbb"
| 130 || August 28 || Indians || 2–6 || Kluber (13–4) || Severino (11–6) || — || Yankee Stadium''' || 36,253 || 70–60
|- bgcolor="bbbbbb"
| — || August 29 || Indians || colspan=7 |Postponed (rain). Makeup date: August 30
|- bgcolor="ffbbbb"
| 131 || August 30 || Indians || 1–2 || Bauer (14–8) || García (5–9) || Allen (22) || Yankee Stadium ||  || 70–61
|- bgcolor="ffbbbb"
| 132 || August 30 || Indians || 4–9 || Merritt (2–0) || Montgomery (7–7) || — || Yankee Stadium || 39,598 || 70–62
|- bgcolor="bbffbb"
| 133 || August 31 || Red Sox || 6–2 || Sabathia (11–5) || Rodriguez (4–5) || — || Yankee Stadium || 43,309 || 71–62

|- bgcolor="ffbbbb"
| 134 || September 1 || Red Sox || 1–4 || Fister (4–7) || Gray (8–9) || Kimbrel (32) || Yankee Stadium || 42,332 || 71–63
|- bgcolor="bbffbb"
| 135 || September 2 || Red Sox || 5–1 || Tanaka (11–10) || Pomeranz (14–5) || — || Yankee Stadium || 46,536 || 72–63
|- bgcolor="bbffbb"
| 136 || September 3 || Red Sox || 9–2 || Severino (12–6) || Sale (15–7) || — || Yankee Stadium || 46,717 || 73–63
|- bgcolor="bbffbb"
| 137 || September 4 || @ Orioles || 7–4 || Green (3–0) || Bundy (13–9) || — || Oriole Park || 37,622 || 74–63
|- bgcolor="ffbbbb"
| 138 || September 5 || @ Orioles || 6–7 || Britton (2–0) || Betances (3–6) || — || Oriole Park || 14,377 || 74–64
|- bgcolor="bbbbbb"
| — || September 6 || @ Orioles || colspan=7 |''Postponed (rain). Makeup date: September 7
|- bgcolor="bbffbb"
| 139 || September 7 || @ Orioles || 9–1 || Gray (9–9) || Gausman (10–10) || — || Oriole Park || 14,946 || 75–64
|- bgcolor="ffbbbb"
| 140 || September 8 || @ Rangers || 5–11 || Pérez (12–10) || Tanaka (11–11) || — || Globe Life Park || 35,883 || 75–65
|- bgcolor="bbffbb"
| 141 || September 9 || @ Rangers || 3–1 || Robertson (7–2) || Claudio (4–2) || Chapman (17) || Globe Life Park || 38,135 || 76–65
|- bgcolor="bbffbb"
| 142 || September 10 || @ Rangers || 16–7 || Green (4–0) || Griffin (6–6) || — || Globe Life Park || 31,349 || 77–65
|- bgcolor="bbffbb"
| 143 || September 11 || @ Rays || 5–1 || Robertson (8–2) || Odorizzi (8–8) || — || Citi Field || 15,327 || 78–65
|- bgcolor="ffbbbb"
| 144 || September 12 || @ Rays || 1–2 || Hunter (3–5) || Gray (9–10) || Colomé (44) || Citi Field || 21,024 || 78–66
|- bgcolor="bbffbb"
| 145 || September 13 || @ Rays || 3–2 || Green (5–0) || Archer (9–10) || Chapman (18)  || Citi Field || 13,159 || 79–66
|- bgcolor="bbffbb"
| 146 || September 14 || Orioles || 13–5 || Tanaka (12–11)  || Miley (8–13) || — || Yankee Stadium || 37,128 || 80–66
|- bgcolor="bbffbb"
| 147 || September 15 || Orioles || 8–2 || Severino (13–6) || Ynoa (1–2) || — || Yankee Stadium || 40,460 || 81–66
|- bgcolor="bbffbb"
| 148 || September 16 || Orioles || 9–3 || Montgomery (8–7) || Hellickson (8–10) || — || Yankee Stadium || 40,114 || 82–66
|- bgcolor="ffbbbb"
| 149 || September 17 || Orioles || 4–6 || Jiménez (6–10) || Gray (9–11) || Britton (15) || Yankee Stadium || 38,189 || 82–67
|- bgcolor="bbffbb"
| 150 || September 18 || Twins || 2–1 || Robertson (9–2) || Santana (15–8) || Chapman (19)  || Yankee Stadium || 30,425 || 83–67
|- bgcolor="bbffbb"
| 151 || September 19 || Twins || 5–2 || Sabathia (12–5) || Berríos (12–8) || Chapman (20) || Yankee Stadium || 30,218 || 84–67
|- bgcolor="bbffbb"
| 152 || September 20 || Twins || 11–3 || Shreve (4–1)  || Colón (6–14) || — || Yankee Stadium || 30,099 || 85–67
|- bgcolor="ffbbbb"
| 153 || September 22 || @ Blue Jays || 1–8 || Estrada (10–8) || Tanaka (12–12) || — || Rogers Centre || 42,153 || 85–68
|- bgcolor="bbffbb"
| 154 || September 23 || @ Blue Jays || 5–1 || Gray (10–11) || Biagini (3–12) || — || Rogers Centre || 46,949 || 86–68
|- bgcolor="ffbbbb"
| 155 || September 24 || @ Blue Jays || 5–9 || Stroman (13–8) || García (5–10) || — || Rogers Centre || 47,394 || 86–69
|- bgcolor="bbffbb"
| 156 || September 25 || Royals || 11–3 || Sabathia (13–5) ||Junis (8–3) || — || Yankee Stadium || 40,023 || 87–69
|- bgcolor="bbffbb"
| 157 || September 26 || Rays || 6–1 || Montgomery (9–7) || Snell (4–7) || — || Yankee Stadium || 30,434 || 88–69
|- bgcolor="bbffbb"
| 158 || September 27 || Rays || 6–1 || Severino (14–6) || Andriese (5–5) || — || Yankee Stadium || 30,549 || 89–69
|- bgcolor="ffbbbb"
| 159 || September 28 || Rays || 6–9 || Hu (1–1) || Gray (10–12) || — || Yankee Stadium || 32,933 || 89–70
|- bgcolor="bbffbb"
| 160 || September 29 || Blue Jays || 4–0 || Tanaka (13–12) || Biagini (3–13) || Chapman (21) || Yankee Stadium || 35,735 || 90–70
|- bgcolor="bbffbb"
| 161 || September 30 || Blue Jays || 2–1 || Sabathia (14–5) || Stroman (13–9) || Chapman (22)  || Yankee Stadium || 39,457 || 91–70
|- bgcolor="ffbbbb"
| 162 || October 1 || Blue Jays || 1–2 || Barnes (3–6) || German (0–1) || Osuna (39) || Yankee Stadium || 37,428 || 91–71

Postseason
Game log

|- bgcolor="bbffbb"
| 1 || October 3 || Twins || Yankee Stadium || 8–4 || Robertson (1–0) || Berríos (0–1) || — || 49,280 || 1–0 

|- bgcolor="ffbbbb"
| 1 || October 5 || @ Indians || Progressive Field || 0–4 || Bauer (1–0) || Gray (0–1) || Allen (1) || 37,612 || 0–1
|- bgcolor="ffbbbb"
| 2 || October 6 || @ Indians || Progressive Field || 8–9  || Tomlin (1–0) || Betances (0–1) || – || 37,681 ||0–2
|- bgcolor="bbffbb"
| 3 || October 8 || Indians || Yankee Stadium || 1–0 || Tanaka (1–0) || Miller (0–1) || Chapman (1) || 48,614 || 1–2
|- bgcolor="bbffbb"
| 4 || October 9 || Indians || Yankee Stadium || 7–3 || Severino (1–0) || Bauer (1–1) || Kahnle (1) || 47,316 || 2–2
|- bgcolor="bbffbb"
| 5 || October 11 || @ Indians || Progressive Field || 5–2 || Robertson (1–0) || Kluber (0–1) || Chapman (2) || 37,802 || 3–2

|- bgcolor="ffbbbb"
| 1 || October 13 || @ Astros || Minute Maid Park || 1–2 || Keuchel (1–0) || Tanaka (0-1) || Giles (1) || 43,116 || 0–1
|- bgcolor="ffbbbb"
| 2 || October 14 || @ Astros || Minute Maid Park || 1–2 || Verlander (1–0) || Chapman (0–1) || – || 43,193 || 0–2
|- bgcolor="bbffbb"
| 3 || October 16 || Astros || Yankee Stadium || 8–1 || Sabathia (1–0) || Morton (0–1) || – || 49,373 || 1–2
|- bgcolor="bbffbb"
| 4 || October 17 || Astros || Yankee Stadium || 6–4 || Green (1–0) || Giles (0–1) || Chapman (1) || 48,804 || 2–2
|- bgcolor="bbffbb"
| 5 || October 18 || Astros || Yankee Stadium || 5–0 || Tanaka (1–1) || Keuchel (1–1) || – || 49,647 || 3–2
|- bgcolor="ffbbbb"
| 6 || October 20 || @ Astros || Minute Maid Park || 1–7 || Verlander (2–0) || Severino (0–1) || – || 43,179 || 3–3
|- bgcolor="ffbbbb"
| 7 || October 21 || @ Astros || Minute Maid Park || 0–4 || Morton (1–1) || Sabathia''' (1–1) || McCullers (1) || 43,201 || 3–4

Postseason rosters

| style="text-align:left" |
Pitchers: 30 David Robertson 40 Luis Severino 43 Adam Warren 45 Chasen Shreve 48 Tommy Kahnle 52 CC Sabathia 54 Aroldis Chapman 55 Sonny Gray 57 Chad Green 68 Dellin Betances 
Catchers: 24 Gary Sánchez 27 Austin Romine 
Infielders: 14 Starlin Castro 18 Didi Gregorius 29 Todd Frazier 33 Greg Bird 39 Tyler Wade 74 Ronald Torreyes
Outfielders: 11 Brett Gardner 22 Jacoby Ellsbury 31 Aaron Hicks 77 Clint Frazier 99 Aaron Judge
Designated hitters: 12 Chase Headley 17 Matt Holliday
|- valign="top"

| style="text-align:left" |
Pitchers: 19 Masahiro Tanaka 30 David Robertson 34 Jaime García 40 Luis Severino 43 Adam Warren 47 Jordan Montgomery 48 Tommy Kahnle 52 CC Sabathia 54 Aroldis Chapman 55 Sonny Gray 57 Chad Green 68 Dellin Betances 
Catchers: 24 Gary Sánchez 27 Austin Romine 
Infielders: 14 Starlin Castro 18 Didi Gregorius 29 Todd Frazier 33 Greg Bird 74 Ronald Torreyes
Outfielders: 11 Brett Gardner 22 Jacoby Ellsbury 31 Aaron Hicks 99 Aaron Judge
Designated hitters: 12 Chase Headley 17 Matt Holliday
|- valign="top"

| style="text-align:left" |
Pitchers: 19 Masahiro Tanaka 30 David Robertson 34 Jaime García 40 Luis Severino 43 Adam Warren 47 Jordan Montgomery 48 Tommy Kahnle 52 CC Sabathia 54 Aroldis Chapman 55 Sonny Gray 57 Chad Green 68 Dellin Betances 
Catchers: 24 Gary Sánchez 27 Austin Romine 
Infielders: 14 Starlin Castro 18 Didi Gregorius 29 Todd Frazier 33 Greg Bird 74 Ronald Torreyes
Outfielders: 11 Brett Gardner 22 Jacoby Ellsbury 31 Aaron Hicks 99 Aaron Judge
Designated hitters: 12 Chase Headley 17 Matt Holliday
|- valign="top"

Farm system

Notes

References

External links
 2017 New York Yankees season
 2017 New York Yankees season at Baseball Reference

New York Yankees seasons
New York Yankees
New York Yankees
2010s in the Bronx